Adrian Rúnason Justinussen (born 21 July 1998) is a Faroese professional footballer who plays as a forward for Faroe Islands Premier League club Havnar Bóltfelag and the Faroe Islands national team.

Club career
Justinussen is a youth academy graduate of Havnar Bóltfelag. On 24 May 2020, he completed a hat-trick in nine minutes by scoring only free kicks in a league match against Argja Bóltfelag. On 3 March 2021, he signed a contract extension with the club until the end of the 2023 season.

International career
Justinussen made his senior team debut for Faroe Islands on 29 March 2022 in a 1–0 friendly win over Liechtenstein.

Personal life
Justinussen is a student at Glasir Tórshavn college.

Career statistics

Club

International

Honours

Club
HB II
2. deild: 2015

HB
Faroe Islands Premier League: 2018, 2020
Faroe Islands Cup: 2019, 2020
Faroe Islands Super Cup: 2019, 2021

Individual
Faroese Footballer of the Year: 2018
Faroe Islands Premier League top scorer: 2018

References

External links
 

1998 births
Living people
Association football forwards
Faroese footballers
Faroe Islands youth international footballers
Faroe Islands under-21 international footballers
Faroe Islands Premier League players
Havnar Bóltfelag players